Gökçetaş is a village in Mut district of Mersin Province, Turkey. Population of Gökçetaş was 637 as of 2012. The village is an old village. During the reign of Ottoman sultan Beyazıt II (15th century),  it was known as Sekitler. The origin of the population was Abdal, a religious group, which migrated from Central Anatolia following the campaigns of Gedik Ahmet Pasha. Later it was renamed as Sanşa and after 1960 as Gökçetaş. The main economic activities are agriculture and animal breeding.

References

Villages in Mut District